Francesca Diggs is a New Hampshire politician.

Education
Diggs earned a BA in English from University of Mississippi and did graduate studies in educational psychology.

Career
On November 6, 2018, Diggs was elected to the New Hampshire House of Representatives where she represents the Grafton 16 district. She assumed office on December 5, 2018. She is a Democrat.

Personal life
Diggs resides in Rumney, New Hampshire. Diggs is married and has three children.

References

Living people
University of Mississippi alumni
People from Rumney, New Hampshire
Women state legislators in New Hampshire
Democratic Party members of the New Hampshire House of Representatives
21st-century American politicians
21st-century American women politicians
Year of birth missing (living people)